Bad Muskau (formerly Muskau) is a spa town in the historic Upper Lusatia region in Germany, at the border with Poland. It is part of the Görlitz district in the State of Saxony.

It is located on the banks of the Lusatian Neisse river. The town is part of the recognized Sorbian settlement area in Saxony. Upper Sorbian has an official status next to German, with all villages bearing names in both languages.

The town of Lugknitz, formerly incorporated into Bad Muskau, was separated in 1945 by the new state border drawn along the Oder–Neisse line. Muskau Park, a UNESCO World Heritage Site, is similarly split with the municipality containing its western half. Bad Muskau gained worldwide fame through prince and landscape artist Hermann von Pückler-Muskau, who created a unique cultural asset with his landscape park.

History 

Muskau (Sorbian, "men's town") was founded in the 13th century as a trading center and defensive location on the Neisse, being first mentioned in a document in 1249. The state country (Standesherrschaft) of Muskau was the largest of the Holy Roman Empire. From 1319 it was part of the Duchy of Jawor, one of Lower Silesian duchies of fragmented Piast-ruled Poland. In 1329 it passed to the Bohemian (Czech) Kingdom, where it formed part of the Margraviate of Upper Lusatia, a Bohemian (Czech) Crown Land. The town passed into the possession of the von Bieberstein family in 1447, gaining its charter in 1452. Part of the von Bieberstein crest, the red five-pointed stag horn, remains in the town's coat of arms.

By the 1635 Peace of Prague it passed to the Electorate of Saxony, later elevated to the Kingdom of Saxony in 1806. Between 1697 and 1763, it was also under rule of Polish kings in personal union and was one of two main routes connecting Warsaw and Dresden ran through the town at that time. Kings Augustus II the Strong and Augustus III of Poland often traveled that route. In 1815, the northern and eastern parts of Upper Lusatia came to Prussia as a result of the Congress of Vienna, which reorganized the political order of Europe after the Coalition Wars (1792–1815) and from then on bore the official name "Prussian Upper Lusatia". Administratively, this area was integrated into the Province of Silesia and later into the Province of Lower Silesia, which existed until 1945.

In the so-called "Zornfeuer" of 1766, the city burned down completely; Only the town church and the castle on the Burglehn were spared. During the withdrawal of the Napoleonic army from Russia in 1813, Württemberg cuirassiers brought a typhus epidemic to Muskau, which killed around a fifth of the population. The inhabitants lived (with a few exceptions) in the status of hereditary subservience, which was only ended after 1815 under Prussian rule.

Due to the rich clay deposits, a strong pottery trade developed in Muskau. During its heyday from the 17th to the middle of the 19th century, up to 20 masters settled in the southern suburb of the town, the Schmelze (today Schmelzstrasse).

The first documented mention of alum mining in the town of Muskau comes from 1573. The alum hut, laid out on the site of today's bathing park, was once one of the oldest in Saxony, along with the huts in Reichenbach, Schwemsal and Freienwalde. Alum mining stopped in 1864.

In the 19th century, lignite was mined in the area between Muskau and Weißwasser.

Until the beginning of the 19th century Muskau's direct rulers were the Counts of Callenberg, succeeded up to 1845 by Count (later Prince) Hermann von Pückler-Muskau, later on by Prince Wilhelm Friedrich Karl von Oranien-Nassau, and after him by the Counts von Arnim, right up to their flight in April 1945.

Towards the end of the Second World War, the city was severely damaged by artillery fire from the Soviet Army, which was pushing over the Neisse, and by the 2nd Polish Army. After World War II, the town was divided along the Neisse River between East Germany and Poland. About two thirds of the park came under Polish administration. In Autumn 1945, the castle and large parts of the city fell victim to a fire. In July 1945, Count von Arnim received the notification that “class rule and all businesses had been seized without compensation." Muskau was largely rebuilt with the exception of the town church, the Sorbian St. Andrew's Church, and the town hall. The town church was blown up in April 1959.

In 1962 Muskau was renamed "Bad Muskau" (spa town Muskau), with the construction of a sanatorium on the site of brine source. In 1972 the border crossing between East Germany and Poland was opened and visa-free local border traffic was allowed.

The Sorbs make up a very strongly part of the population to this day, with the Muskau dialect spoken in and around the town. Today Sorbian is - theoretically, but not actually - the second official language.

Governance

Town twinning
 Łęknica, Poland
 Bolków, Poland

Notable people 
 Nathaniel Gottfried Leske (1751–1786), natural scientist and geologist
 Leopold Schefer (1784–1862), writer and composer
 Hermann von Pückler-Muskau (1785–1871), famous landscape gardener and writer, founder of the Park von Muskau
 Gustav Fechner (1801–1887), experimental psychologist
 Eduard Petzold (1815–1891), landscape gardener
 Alwin Schultz (1838-1909), art and cultural historian
 Paul Kraske (1851–1930), surgeon
 Bruno von Mudra (1851-1931), General of Infantry and freeman of Muskau
 Werner Richter (1888-1969), writer
 Erna Pfitzinger (1898–1988), potter
 Karl Peglau (1927-2009), traffic psychologist, inventor of the East German Ampelmännchen for traffic lights
 Olaf Zinke (1966), skater, Olympic gold medalist
 Tim Kleindienst (1995), soccer player

In addition, a number of professional hockey players were born in Bad Muskau: 
Ronny Arendt (born 1980) 
Frank Hördler (born 1985)  
Ivonne Schröder (born 1988) 
Elia Ostwald (born 1988)  
Toni Ritter (born 1990)

References

External links

 Official website of Bad Muskau

 
Towns in Görlitz (district)
Germany–Poland border crossings
Spa towns in Germany
Populated places established in the 13th century